Devosia is a genus of Gram-negative soil bacteria. It is named after the Belgian microbiologist Paul De Vos. They are motile by flagella, the cells are rod-shaped.

References

Hyphomicrobiales
Bacteria genera